The South Yeocomico River is a  tidal river in the U.S. state of Virginia. It is an arm of the Yeocomico River, itself an inlet from the Potomac River.

See also
List of rivers of Virginia

References

USGS Hydrologic Unit Map – State of Virginia (1974)

Rivers of Virginia